A City Architect is a public office that has existed in some cities.  It is a form of council architect.

 Bath City Architect
 City Architect of Birmingham
 Edinburgh (see Thomas Brown and  David Cousin)

Architecture occupations